Ralph Everard Gonsalves (born 8 August 1946) is a Vincentian politician. He is currently the Prime Minister of Saint Vincent and the Grenadines, and leader of the Unity Labour Party (ULP).

Gonsalves is the longest continuously serving head of government since St. Vincent and the Grenadines became independent in 1979. He became Prime Minister after his party won a majority government in the 2001 general election. He was the first Prime Minister from the newly constructed ULP, following a merger of the Saint Vincent and the Grenadines Labour Party and the Movement for National Unity.

Gonsalves has been Member of Parliament (MP) for the constituency of North Central Windward since 1994. In 1994, upon the formation of the Unity Labour Party he became deputy leader, and became leader of the party in 1998.

With Gonsalves as leader, the ULP won a majority in the popular vote in every general election from 1998 through 2015, though it failed to secure the majority of parliamentary seats in the 1998 election. In 2020, the ULP won the election, but did not win the popular vote. On 7 November 2020, Gonsalves was sworn in for his fifth term as Prime Minister.

Early life and education
Gonsalves, known affectionately as "Comrade Ralph", was born in Colonarie, Saint Vincent, British Windward Islands to his father, Alban Gonsalves, a farmer and small businessman (now deceased), and his mother, Theresa Francis, a small businesswoman. His ancestors came to Saint Vincent and the Grenadines in 1845 as indentured servants from the Portuguese island of Madeira.

Gonsalves attended Colonarie Roman Catholic School, and later the St. Vincent Grammar School. He then enrolled at the University of the West Indies, where he completed a bachelor's degree in economics. He later returned there to earn a master's degree in government, which he completed in 1971. In 1974 he completed a doctorate in government at the University of Manchester. Gonsalves was called to the bar at Gray's Inn in London in 1981. He also attended Makerere University in Uganda according to his address at the United Nations during the Africa Day event on 25 May 2019.

Political career

Gonsalves became involved in politics at university, as president of the University of West Indies' Guild of Undergraduates and Debating Society. In 1968, he led a student protest of the deportation of historian and intellectual Walter Rodney by the Jamaican government.

In 1994, Gonsalves became the deputy leader of the Saint Vincent and the Grenadines Labour Party. After the resignation of Vincent Beache, Gonsalves became leader of the party in 1998. Gonsalves later led the Unity Labour Party to win the 2001 general election, becoming Prime Minister and Minister of Finance. His ULP was re-elected in the 2005 general election. In the 2010 general election, Gonsalves and the ULP were narrowly re-elected with 51.11% of the popular vote.

In 2009 Gonsalves and the ULP led a referendum campaign in favour of constitutional reform that would have abolished the country's constitutional monarchy, replacing Elizabeth II with a non-executive president. The referendum was defeated, with 55.64% of voters rejecting the changes.

In November 2017 Gonsalves gave up the portfolio of Minister of Finance to his son, Camillo Gonsalves.

On 3 July 2020, Gonsalves was elected Chairman of the Caribbean Community succeeding Mia Amor Mottley. His 6-month term ended on 1 January 2021, and he was succeeded by Trinidad and Tobago prime minister, Keith Rowley.

In November 2020, Ralph Gonsalves, Prime Minister of Saint Vincent and the Grenadines since 2001, made history by securing the fifth consecutive victory of his Unity Labour Party (ULP) in  general election.

Outside politics
Gonsalves practices law before the Eastern Caribbean Supreme Court. He has written and published on a range of matters including the Caribbean, Africa, trade unionism, comparative political economy, and developmental issues generally.

Personal life
Gonsalves has been married twice; currently he is married to Eloise Harris. He has two sons by his first marriage, Camillo and Adam; one son by his second wife, Storm; and two daughters, Isis and Soleil. Camillo followed his father into politics, and is currently serving as Minister of Finance.

2021 anti-vaccine protest attack 
On Thursday, August 5, 2021, at a protest against mandatory vaccination from COVID-19 organized by trade unions representing nurses, police and other workers, Gonsalves was attacked with a projectile near the entrance to Parliament. He sustained visible injuries to his head in the attack. The attack occurred during a large protest against masks and vaccinations in the country.  Gonsalves was rushed to the hospital where he was confirmed to be in a stable condition.

International honours
  :
  Grand Cross of the Order of the Liberator General San Martín (2015)

  :
  Order of José Marti (2022)

 :
  Order of Brilliant Star with Special Grand Cordon (2003)

Publications
Books
Diary of a Prime Minister: Ten days among Benedictine Monks
The Making of 'the Comrade': The Political Journey of Ralph Gonsalves
The spectre of imperialism: the case of the Caribbean (University of the West Indies; 128 pages, 1976)
The non-capitalist path of development: Africa and the Caribbean (One Caribbean Publishers; 1981)
History and the future: a Caribbean perspective (169 pages, 1994)
Notes on some basic ideas in Marxism-Leninism (University of the West Indies; 56 pages)
Theses
The role of labour in the political process of St. Vincent (1935–1970) (Master's Thesis, 1971)
The politics of trade unions and industrial relations in Uganda (1950–1971) (Doctoral Thesis, 1974)
Pamphlets
The Rodney affair and its aftermath (University of the West Indies; 21 pages, 1975)
The development and class character of the bourgeois state: the case of St. Vincent (University of the West Indies; 15 pages, 1976)
Controls and influences on the civil service and statutory bodies in the Commonwealth Caribbean: a preliminary discussion (University of the West Indies; 67 pages, 1977)
The development of the labour movement in St. Vincent (37 pages, 1977)
Who killed sugar in St. Vincent? (United Liberation Movement; 21 pages, 1977)
On the political economy of Barbados (One Caribbean Publishers; 49 pages, 1981)
The trade union movement in St. Vincent and the Grenadines (Movement for National Unity; 64 pages, 1983)
Ebenezer Joshua: his ideology and style (Movement for National Unity; 39 pages, 1984)
(editor) The trial of George McIntosh (Caribbean Diaspora Press; 80 pages, 1985)
Authority in the police force: its uses and abuses (Movement for National Unity; 45 pages, 1986)
Banana in trouble: its present and future (Movement for National Unity; 22 pages, 1989)

References

|-

|-

|-

1946 births
Living people
Members of the House of Assembly of Saint Vincent and the Grenadines
Finance ministers of Saint Vincent and the Grenadines
Foreign Ministers of Saint Vincent and the Grenadines
Prime Ministers of Saint Vincent and the Grenadines
Saint Vincent and the Grenadines lawyers
Unity Labour Party politicians
University of the West Indies alumni
Portuguese Caribbean
Republicanism in Saint Vincent and the Grenadines
Members of Gray's Inn
People from Charlotte Parish, Saint Vincent and the Grenadines
Saint Vincent and the Grenadines people of Portuguese descent
Recipients of the Order of Brilliant Star
Grand Crosses of the Order of the Liberator General San Martin